Sylvain Chtounder (born: 1 April 1964) is a sailor from Marseilles, France. who represented his country at the 1996 Summer Olympics in Savannah, United States as crew member in the Soling. With helmsman Marc Bouet and fellow crew member Gildas Morvan they took the 11th place.

References

External links 
 
 
 
 

1972 births
Living people
French male sailors (sport)
Olympic sailors of France
Sailors at the 1996 Summer Olympics – Soling
Sportspeople from Marseille
20th-century French people